T-cedilla (majuscule: Ţ, minuscule: ţ) is a letter which is part of the Gagauz alphabet, used to represent the Gagauz language sound , the voiceless alveolar affricate (like ts in bolts, or like the letter C in Slavic languages). It is written as the letter T with a cedilla below and it has both the lower-case (U+0163) and the upper-case variants (U+0162).

Usage
The lower case is used in Semitic transliteration.

Gagauz alphabet: 

This character was used in Kabyle (Berber) for the affricate  (now represented with a tt).

Romanian 

In early versions of Unicode, the Romanian letter Ț (T-comma) was considered a glyph variant of Ţ, and therefore was not present in the Unicode Standard. It is also not present in the Windows-1250 (Central Europe) code page. The letter was only added to the standard in Unicode 3.0 (1999), and some texts in Romanian still use Ţ instead.

Character encoding

HTML entity (HTML5 only, not supported by all browsers):

See also
Ț (T-comma)
Ş (S-cedilla)
C c : Latin letter C

References

T-cedilla